Bitch Betta Have My Money 2001 is the third studio album by American rapper AMG. It was released on December 5, 2000 by Lightyear Records.

Track listing
 "Bitch 2001"
 "Jack Off" 
 "Perfection"
 "Soak Me Baby" 
 "She's Paid" 
 "All Over U"
 "Pimp the World"
 "Reallionaire.com"
 "Bounce"
 "Come Inside" 
 "F.M.S.M. 2" 
 "Yo Luv"

AMG (rapper) albums
2000 albums
Albums produced by DJ Quik
Sequel albums